Srungara Ramudu is a 1979 Indian Telugu-language action drama film directed by K. Shankar. It stars N. T. Rama Rao and Latha, with music composed by K. V. Mahadevan. It was produced by Rama Murthy under the Satyatai Productions banner. This film is remake of Hindi film Kashmir Ki Kali (1964).

Plot
In Kashmir, four friends: Rama Narayana, Lakshmi Narayana, Govinda Narayana & Satyanarayana establish a bank called Narayana & Co. All of them live like family. Even their children are also close friends. Lakshmi Narayana has a son Rajaram, Govinda Narayana has a son Jaipal and a daughter Rita while Satyanarayana has a daughter Shanti. Time passes, and the bank earns huge fame and profits. Here a bad intention arises in the minds of Rama Narayana and Lakshmi Narayana, both of them run away with the money killing Govinda Narayana and putting the blame on Satyanarayana. Govinda Narayana, before dying briefs everything to his children and they decide to take revenge against the traitors. Meanwhile, Satyanarayana commits suicide along with his wife Seeta (Dubbing Janaki) due to the insult. Knowing about her husband's depravities Lakshmi Narayana's wife Jaya (Pandari Bai) leaves him and goes to an Ashram.

Years roll by, Lakshmi Narayana passes away and his son Rajaram (N. T. Rama Rao) becomes a millionaire. Jaipal (Sarath Babu) and Rita (Jayamalini) are still in the process of taking revenge. According to it, Rita marries old Rama Narayana. Jaipal tries to trap Rajaram by inviting him to Kashmir on a business deal. Rajaram leaves for Kashmir taking his mother's blessing and she too sends him happy because he must come to know the truth and do penance for his father's sins. In Kashmir, Rajaram gets acquainted with a beautiful girl Shanti (Latha) and they fell in love. After some time, he recognizes her as his childhood friend. Eventually, she reveals the atrocity and injustice done by Lakshmi Narayana and Rama Narayana and he also sees the public who are still suffering by losing their money. He immediately rushes to his mother and she tells him the entire thing is true. Now Rajaram decides to do justice to everyone. He changes his attire and in various forms of disguise recollects the entire money and gives back adding his property too, to the public on 10 times more than their investment and everybody praises him. Finally, the movie ends on a happy note with the marriage of Rajaram and Shanti.

Cast
N. T. Rama Rao as Rajaram
Latha as Shanti 
Prabhakar Reddy as Rama Narayana 
Allu Ramalingaiah as Lingam
Sarath Babu as Jaipal
Tyagaraju as Lakshmi Narayana 
Nalinikanth as Pratap
Ram Mohan as Satyanarayana 
Kakarala as Rangaiah 
Ch. Krishna Murthy as Govinda Narayana 
Pandari Bai as Jaya
Rama Prabha
Jayamalini as Rita
Dubbing Janaki as Seeta

Soundtrack

Music composed by K. V. Mahadevan. Lyrics were written by Acharya Aatreya.

References

Indian action drama films
Films scored by K. V. Mahadevan
Telugu remakes of Hindi films
1970s Telugu-language films
1970s action drama films